Moïse Amyraut, Latin Moyses Amyraldus (September 1596 – 8 January 1664), in English texts often Moses Amyraut, was a French Huguenot, Reformed theologian and metaphysician. He was the architect of Amyraldism, a Calvinist doctrine that made modifications to Calvinist theology regarding the nature of Christ's atonement and covenant theology.

Life
Amyraut was born at Bourgueil, in the valley of the Changeon in the province of Anjou. His father was a lawyer, and, preparing Moses for the same profession, sent him, on the completion of his study of the humanities at Orléans, to the university of Poitiers.

At the university he took the degree of licentiate (BA) of laws. On his way home from the university he passed through Saumur, and, having visited the pastor of the Protestant church there, was introduced by him to Philippe de Mornay, governor of the city. Struck with young Amyraut's ability and culture, they both urged him to change from law to theology. His father advised him to revise his philological and philosophical studies, and read over Calvin's Institutions, before finally determining a course. He did so, and decided for theology.

He moved to the Academy of Saumur and studied under John Cameron, who ultimately regarded him as his greatest scholar. He had a brilliant course, and was in due time licensed as a minister of the French Protestant Church. The contemporary civil wars and excitements hindered his advancement. His first church was in Saint-Aignan, in the province of Maine. There he remained two years. Jean Daillé, who moved to Paris, advised the church at Saumur to secure Amyraut as his successor, praising him "as above himself." The university of Saumur at the same time had fixed its eyes on him as professor of theology. The great churches of Paris and Rouen also contended for him, and to win him sent their deputies to the provincial synod of Anjou.

Amyraut had left the choice to the synod. He was appointed to Saumur in 1633, and to the professor's chair along with the pastorate. On the occasion of his inauguration he maintained for thesis De Sacerdotio Christi. His co-professors were Louis Cappel and Josué de la Place, who also were Cameron's pupils and lifelong friends, who collaborated in the Theses Salmurienses, a collection of theses propounded by candidates in theology prefaced by the inaugural addresses of the three professors. Amyraut soon gave to French Protestantism a new direction.

In 1631 he published his Traité des religions; and from this year onward he was a foremost man in the church. Chosen to represent the provincial synod of Anjou, Touraine and Maine at the 1631 , he was appointed as orator to present to the king The Copy of their Complaints and Grievances for the Infractions and Violations of the Edict of Nantes.

Previous deputies had addressed the king on their bent knees, whereas the representatives of the Catholics had been permitted to stand. Amyraut consented to be orator only if the assembly authorized him to stand. There was intense resistance. Cardinal Richelieu himself, preceded by lesser dignitaries, condescended to visit Amyraut privately, to persuade him to kneel; but Amyraut held resolutely to his point and carried it. His "oration" on this occasion, which was immediately published in the French Mercure, remains a striking landmark in the history of French Protestantism. During his absence on this matter the assembly debated "whether the Lutherans who desired it, might be admitted into communion with the Reformed Churches of France at the Lord's Table." It was decided in the affirmative previous to his return; but he approved with astonishing eloquence, and thereafter was ever in the front rank in maintaining intercommunion between all churches holding the main doctrines of the Reformation.

Pierre Bayle recounts the title-pages of no fewer than thirty-two books of which Amyraut was the author. These show that he took part in all the great controversies on predestination and Arminianism which then so agitated and harassed all Europe. Substantially he held fast the Calvinism of his preceptor Cameron; but, like Richard Baxter in England, by his breadth and charity he exposed himself to all manner of misconstruction. In 1634 he published his Traité de la predestination, in which he tried to mitigate the harsh features of predestination by his Universalismus hypotheticus. God, he taught, predestines all men to happiness on condition of their having faith. This gave rise to a charge of heresy, of which he was acquitted at the national synod held at Alençon in 1637, and presided over by Benjamin Basnage (1580–1652). The charge was brought up again at the national synod of Charenton in 1644, when he was again acquitted. A third attack at the synod of Loudun in 1659 met with no better success. The university of Saumur became the university of French Protestantism.

Amyraut had as many as a hundred students in attendance upon his lectures. One of these was William Penn, who would later go on to found the Pennsylvania Colony in America based in part on Amyraut's notions of religious freedom . Another historic part filled by Amyraut was in the negotiations originated by Pierre le Gouz de la Berchère (1600–1653), first president of the parlement of Grenoble, when exiled to Saumur, for a reconciliation and reunion of the Catholics of France with the French Protestants. Very large were the concessions made by Richelieu in his personal interviews with Amyraut; but, as with the Worcester House negotiations in England between the Church of England and nonconformists, they inevitably fell through. On all sides the statesmanship and eloquence of Amyraut were conceded. His De l'elevation de la foy et de l'abaissement de la raison en la creance des mysteres de la religion (1641) gave him early a high place as a metaphysician. Exclusive of his controversial writings, he left behind him a very voluminous series of practical evangelical books, which have long remained the "fireside" favourites of the peasantry of French Protestantism. Amongst these are Estat des fideles apres la mort; Sur l'oraison dominicale; Du merite des oeuvres; Traité de la justification; and paraphrases of books of the Old and New Testament. His closing years were weakened by a severe fall he met with in 1657. He died on 18 January 1664.

Seventeenth century opponents
There were a number of theologians who defended Calvinistic orthodoxy against Amyraut and Saumur, including Friedrich Spanheim (1600–1649) and Francis Turretin (1623–1687). Ultimately, the Helvetic Consensus was drafted to counteract the theology of Saumur and Amyraldism.

See also
 Amyraldism
 Richard Baxter

Notes

References
 Edm. Saigey, Moses Amyraut, sa vie et ses écrits (1849)
 Alex. Schweizer in Tüb. theol. Jahrbb., 1852, pp. 41 ff. 155 ff., Protestant.
 Central-Dogmen (1854 ff.), ii. 225 ff., and in Herzog-Hauck, Realencyklopädie
 Pierre Bayle, s.v.; Biog. Univ., s.v.
 John Quick, Synodicon in Gallia Reformata, pp. 352–357
 John Quick (MS). Icones Sacrae Gallicanae: Life of Cameron

External links

1596 births
1664 deaths
People from Indre-et-Loire
Huguenots
French Calvinist and Reformed theologians
17th-century Calvinist and Reformed ministers
17th-century Calvinist and Reformed theologians
17th-century French theologians